Tunis University is a university in Tunis, Tunisia. It was founded in 1960 on the basis of earlier educational establishments.

The University of Tunis is a member of the Mediterranean University Union (UNIMED) and of Agence universitaire de la Francophonie.

Organisation 

The university is organised into the following institutions.

 Ecole Normale Supérieure (the oldest institute of the university)
 Higher School of Economic and Commercial Sciences 
 Higher School of Technological Sciences 
 Faculty of Human and Social Sciences 
 Preparatory Engineering Institute 
 Higher Institute of Literary Studies and Humanities 
 Higher Institute of Dramatic Arts 
 Higher Institute for Youth-Club Activities and Culture 
 Higher Institute of Fine Arts 
 Higher Institute of Applied Studies in Humanities  
 Higher Institute of Applied Studies in Humanities of Zaghouan 
 Higher Institute of Management 
 Higher Institute of Music 
 Higher Institute of Crafts Heritage 
 Tunis Business School 
 National Heritage Institute (Co-Supervision with the Ministry of Culture and the Safeguard of the Heritage)

Preparatory Engineering Institute
The Tunis Preparatory Engineering Institute was created according to the law N°95-40 on 24 April 1995.

Notable alumni and academics
 Hédi Annabi (4 September 1943 – 12 January 2010), a Tunisian diplomat and Special Representative of the United Nations Secretary-General
 Noureddine Bhiri (born 10 July 1958), Tunisian politician
 Mohamed Brahmi (15 May 1955 – 25 July 2013), Tunisian politician 
 Fatma Chamakh-Haddad (10 March 1936 – 2 May 2013), professor, philosopher, feminist and activist
 Fadela Echebbi (born 23 January 1946), Tunisian author and poet
 Michel Foucault (15 October 1926 – 25 June 1984), French historian, philosopher, and literary critic
 Mohamed Ghannouchi (born 18 August 1941), the former Prime Minister of Tunisia and self-proclaimed acting president of the country for a few hours starting 14 January 2011
 Mohamed Ghozzi (born 24 February 1949 in Kairouan), Tunisian poet and critic
 Hamadi Jebali (born 12 January 1949), Prime Minister of Tunisia from December 2011 to March 2013
Jeanne-Claude, (13 June 1943, Casablanca – 18 November 2009, New York City), environmental artist
 Thouraya Jeribi Khémiri (born 21 August 1960), Minister of Justice.
 Souhayr Belhassen (born 1943), human rights activist and journalist.
 Sadok Chaabane (born 23 February 1950), University Professor.
 Abdelfattah Mourou (born 1 June 1948), Politician and Lawyer.

References

External links
Tunis University Website 
UNIMED
 AUF

 
1960 establishments in Tunisia
Educational institutions established in 1960
Universities in Tunisia
Education in Tunis